The Bale revolt or the Bale Peasant Movement was an insurgency that took place in the 1960's in the southeastern Ethiopian province of Bale among the local Oromo and Somali populations. The revolt targeted the feudalist system in place during the Ethiopian Empire and was rooted in ethnic and religious grievances.

Initially acts of resistance began in 1962 and 1963 as a defensive reaction by peasants to land expropriation, bureaucratic corruption, and exorbitant taxation imposed by the government. However, further clashes and consequent government reprisals eventually transformed the peasants into a decentralized insurgency that would go on to wage a six-year long guerrilla war, ending in 1970.

Support from the Somali government that had begun in 1963 was integral to the insurgencies ability to sustain combat operations, and consequently played a significant part in the rising tensions leading up to the 1964 Ethiopian–Somali Border War.

Background

Bale Province

Bale province is a large administrative region in southeastern Ethiopia, possessing a highly varied topography ranging from forests to large mountain ranges. The province is primarily composed of the Oromo and Somali peoples. They overwhelmingly adhere to the Islamic faith. Common faith provided a basis for cooperation when the insurgency would break out in 1963.

Origins

Amhara Resettlement and Taxation 
Serious discontent initially began in response to what the Somali and Oromo populations perceived as exploitation by the Ethiopian government. The government had begun a process of resettlement in Bale province using Amhara settlers from Shewa, who were overwhelmingly Christian. The use of northern settlers to secure southern regions of the empire was a tactic that was used extensively in the 10th to 16th centuries of the Abyssinian Empire and during the reign of Menelik. This resettlement policy consequently resulted in a shortage of arable land in Bale due to land expropriation. The best land in the region eventually became owned by Amharas and higher officials in the province were disproportionately Christian, greatly incensing the Muslim Oromo/Somali population.

Taxation by the imperial government was also widely viewed as exorbitant and unjust by the population of Bale further inflaming rebellious sentiments in the province. A significant increase in land taxes being considered the most aggravating. Professor of African Studies, John Markakis would write of the conditions preceding the revolt:"The legal exactions of the state and the landlords were compounded by a host of illegal impositions levied by the ruling class on the peasantry, usually associated with matters related to land. Land measurement, classification, registration, inheritance, litigation and so on were matters that could be concluded only through the payment of enforced bribes to a series of officials, and were subject to the risk of fraud in the process. Tax payment itself required the running of a gauntlet manned by officials who had to be bribed to conclude the transaction properly. Venality, the hallmark of Ethiopian officialdom throughout the empire, reached its apogee in the conquered areas of the south, where the hapless peasantry had no recourse against it. Northern officials serving in the south hoped to amass a small fortune during their tour of duty, and to acquire land through grant, purchase or other means. The scale of their exploits in Bale affronted even some of their colleagues...There was precious little return for such impositions."A combination of these government policies are widely considered to be the primary the catalyst of the revolt, as many of the Oromo and Somali peasants would jointly refuse to pay taxes or allow land access to the Ethiopian government.

Somali Independence 

In 1960, the colonial territory of British Somaliland and the Italian ruled UN Trusteeship of Somalia merged to form the Somali Republic. Following the union a desire to merge with Somalia developed among the Somali populations of Ethiopia, many of whom resided in Bale province These sentiments were further inflamed by radio broadcasts and arms supplies from Somalia.

Revolt

Outbreak (1962 - 1963) 
Incidents of violence had first begun in 1962, but the trigger for the Bale insurgency was a new head tax introduced in early 1963, leading to the first shots fired in March of that year in the El Kere Awrajja (sub-province). The local population refused to pay both the newly introduced taxes and unpaid taxes from previous years. Kahin Abdi, a key figure leading the resistance led attacks on local towns with the help of other resistance leaders. The Ethiopian government attempted to suppress the growing insurgency movement by sending in military forces, but were ineffective. The revolt was led by Oromo leader and rebel figure General Waqo Gutu. Its primary goals were the retention or repossession of land lost to expropriation or resettlement.  

Because the insurgency consisted mostly of inexperienced farmers and peasants, it possessed no real centralized politico-military command structure even though General Gutu was widely viewed as the leader. Numerous clusters of rebels around Bale fought under other insurgent leaders such as Adam Jillo, Ali Butta and Haji Kilta. Several of the revolts leaders were women such as Halima Hassan, Haala Korme and Halimo Waqo. Pastoralists  from the Ogaden, effected by government restrictions on free movement would also join the insurgency.

Waqo Gutu is believed to have started the rebellion when he received no government aid after a conflict over grazing rights. He then turned to Somalia to supply himself and other rebels with weapons. Due to the significant Somali element of the revolt, the Bale rebels would enjoy the support of the Somali government. In a bid to reduce any potential conflict between Somalis and Oromos in Bale, the government of Somalia would characterize incidents of resistance in Bale as a defensive Jihad against Christian Amhara expansion. 

In 1963 a delegation of eight men from the rebels was sent across the Ogaden to Somalia in search of arms. Well received, they obtained eight Carcano M19 (called the Dhombir) rifles and one Thompson submachine gun. Later that year another rebel trip to Somalia brought back additional arms, ammunition, and grenades. Soon additional groups of insurgents began to embark on the long march to Somalia, and the insurgency would gradually gain begin to strengthen. The first shipment from Somalia to the rebels would come in the form of 40 guns.

That same year the Mecha-Tuulama Self-help Association, a movement that would form that core of the future Oromo Liberation Front, would be founded.

Battle of Dhombir 
In one of the landmark battles at Malka Anna near Ganale River in 1963, Oromo insurgents took down two military helicopters using a non-automatic rifle called Dhombir. Hence, the period from 1963 to 1970 is locally known as the Dhombir war after the gun used by the Oromo fighters. The Battle of Dhombir at Malka Anna was critical in that the rebels were able to capture a significant amount of arms, thereby boosting their defensive capabilities.

Spread of revolt (1963 - 1965) 
Serious revolt broke out during a fairly minor incident in the Wabe district of Bale in 1964, after the governor of the region had unsuccessfully attempted to collect taxes with a large police force. This act of defiance to the central government inspired rebellions to pop up elsewhere in the district culminating in the seizure of the town of Belitu by rebel Oromo/Somali forces. Resistance then spread over to neighboring Delo district and by the end of 1965 central Bale was in total revolt and under rebel control. 

During the upheaval, the Christian Amhara settlers would utilize paramilitary units whose conduct would be described as "particularly brutal".

Martial Law and Military Intervention (1966 - 1968) 
Fighting gradually increased in intensity until 1966, at which point the Ethiopian government declared a state of emergency and deployed the army. That same year, the Bale rebels began coordinating with the Western Somali Liberation Front. 

Fierce ground assaults and airstrikes by government forces in high and lowland Bale during the opening months of 1967 resulted in significant casualties amongst the civilian population. The town of Negele Borana served as the main base for the Ethiopian army during the revolt.

Collapse and Suppression 
Between 1968 and 1969 the fortunes of the rebels began to decline.

Foreign Support to Ethiopian Government 
The involvement of foreign military experts aided the government in crushing the insurgency. In 1968, the British government began aiding the Ethiopian government by facilitating the construction of a bridge across the strategic Ganale River, enabling Ethiopian forces to assail vital insurgent bases in the region. British military engineers further aided the creation of roads into rebel territory. The US government also began to assist Ethiopian forces by providing technical assistance and by training the Ethiopian Air Force in aerial based counter insurgent tactics.

1969 Somali coup d'état 

In 1969, after a military coup d'état in Somalia, support for the rebellion was withdrawn. Following the demise of the Somali Republic, the rebels found it virtually impossible to sustain their combat operations in Bale as the Somali arms shipments had been essential.

Negotiated Settlement (1970) 
Soon after, an agreement was reached with the Ethiopian government, and many predominant Oromo leaders were pardoned, marking a formal end to the conflict in 1970.

Consequences and Legacy 
The Bale Revolt to this day remains as symbol of Oromo Nationalism and self-determination. While the exact origins of the Oromo Liberation Front are disputed, many point to the 1960s insurgency as its embryonic phase.

According to Dr. Yonatan Tesfaye Fessha, the Bale Revolt was a testimony to the disgruntlement that was prevalent among the southern local population. This was due to the policies of Haile Selassie's government.

References

Sources 

Rebellions in Ethiopia
History of Ethiopia
20th-century conflicts
Wars involving the states and peoples of Africa
Wars involving Ethiopia
Civil wars involving the states and peoples of Africa
Civil wars post-1945
Cold War conflicts
Conflicts in 1963
Conflicts in 1964
Conflicts in 1965
Conflicts in 1966
Conflicts in 1967
Conflicts in 1968
Conflicts in 1969
Conflicts in 1970